The Ligier JS P320 is an LMP3 Le Mans Prototype. It was created by Onroak Automotive, and named in partnership with former French driver Guy Ligier. It was built to meet ACO Generation II LMP3 standards, and can be built through an update kit for its predecessor, the Ligier JS P3. The car is set to be eligible in a series of Championships worldwide, such as the Michelin Le Mans Cup, Prototype Cup Germany, Asian Le Mans Series, European Le Mans Series, IMSA Prototype Challenge and IMSA SportsCar Championship. The car was launched on 4 June 2019, and was the first Gen II LMP3 to be revealed.

Developmental history 
On 23 May 2018, the Automobile Club de I'Ouest announced a brief outline for the 2020 Generation 2 Le Mans Prototype 3 (LMP3) regulations, alongside chassis models from four manufacturers – Onroak Automotive (Ligier), Duqueine Automotive (Norma), ADESS AG and Ginetta being announced as granted homologation for the new ruleset. On 7 February 2019, the ACO announced the new 2nd Generation Le Mans Prototype 3 (LMP3) regulations, with full implementation due by 2021, and to be raced from 2020 to 2024.

Its predecessor, the Ligier JS P3 was released at a time when LMP3 cars were not intended to race on the Circuit de la Sarthe, and as such, the car was less focused on Aerodynamic efficiency, leading to its lower top speed relative to later LMP3 cars, most notably the Norma M30. As a result, the design department of Ligier Automotive moved to optimise the car's aerodynamics to make the car efficient on all the circuits, in collaboration with Exa Corporation. The car features 95% new bodywork, Ohlins dampers and an adapted cooling system. In addition, as per the new Generation 2 Regulations, Traction control has been introduced, while some safety-related changes have been made to the driver's headrest and seat, along with Zylon side panels. A new engine, the Nissan VK56 is also introduced, with an additional 35 hp. The car had its initial shakedown at the Circuit de Nevers Magny-Cours, ahead of its unveiling.

References 

Le Mans Prototypes
Ligier racing cars
Ligier JS P320 test program car driven by Jos Verstappen